Mocis inferna  is a moth of the family Erebidae. It is found in China.

References

Moths described in 1900
Moths of Asia
inferna